REO Speedwagon (originally stylized as R.E.O. Speedwagon), or simply REO, is an American rock band from Champaign, Illinois. Formed in 1966, the band cultivated a following during the 1970s and achieved significant commercial success throughout the 1980s. The group's best-selling album, Hi Infidelity (1980), contained four US top 40 hits and sold more than 10 million copies.

Over the course of their career, the band has sold more than 40 million records and has charted 13 top 40 hits, including the number ones "Keep On Loving You" and "Can't Fight This Feeling". REO Speedwagon's mainstream popularity waned in the late 1980s, but the band remains a popular live act.

History

Formation
 
In the fall of 1966, Neal Doughty was just beginning an electrical engineering program at the University of Illinois in Champaign, Illinois, as a junior. On his first night of classes, he met fellow student Alan Gratzer. Doughty had learned some Beatles songs on his parents' piano, and Gratzer had been a drummer in local bands since high school. The two held an impromptu jam session in the basement of their Illinois Street Residence Hall dormitory.

Gratzer continued to perform with his band (which had a keyboard-playing lead singer), and Doughty began turning up at gigs. Doughty eventually began sitting in on few songs. On the last day of the university's spring semester, guitarist Joe Matt called the band's leader and told him that he and the other members (Gratzer and bassist Mike Blair) had decided to start a new band with Doughty where everyone but Doughty would sing.

The new band made a list of songs to learn over the summer break. Doughty landed a summer job and bought his first. On his Farfisa organ, he learned "Light My Fire" by The Doors. The members returned to school in the fall of 1967 and had their first rehearsal before classes started. They named the band REO Speedwagon, from the REO Speed Wagon, a 1915 truck that was designed by Ransom Eli Olds.  Doughty had seen the name written across the blackboard when he walked into his History of Transportation class on the first day they had decided to look for a name. Rather than pronouncing REO as a single word as the motor company did , they chose to spell the word out, pronouncing each letter individually ("R-E-O"). An advertisement in the school newspaper produced their first job, a fraternity party that turned into a food fight. They continued to perform cover songs in campus bars, fraternity parties, and university events.

In early 1968, Terry Luttrell became lead singer, and Bob Crownover joined as the guitar player, replacing Matt. When Mike Blair left the band in mid-1968, Gregg Philbin replaced Blair, Marty Shepard played trumpet, and Joe McCabe played sax until McCabe moved to Southern Illinois University. Crownover played guitar for the group until mid-1969 when Bill Fiorio replaced him. Fiorio then departed in late 1969, eventually assuming the name Duke Tumatoe, and went on to form the All Star Frogs. Steve Scorfina (who would go on to found progressive rock/album-oriented rock band Pavlov's Dog) came aboard for over a year, composing with the band and performing live, before being replaced by Gary Richrath in late 1970.

Richrath had driven 100 miles (160 km) to see the band and become a part of it, saying "I'm going to be a part of that band whether they like it or not." Richrath was a Peoria, Illinois-based guitarist and prolific songwriter who brought fresh original compositions. With him on board, the regional popularity of the band grew tremendously. The St. Louis, Missouri-based radio station KSHE, one of America's most influential rock stations, began supporting it, elevating the band's profile outside its Midwestern stronghold.

Epic Records signed the band to a recording contract in 1971. Paul Leka, an East Coast record producer, brought the band to his recording studio in Bridgeport, Connecticut where it recorded original material for its first album. The lineup on the first album consisted of Richrath, Gratzer, Doughty, Philbin, and Luttrell.

Early years
With its equipment being hauled to dates in a friend's station wagon, REO played bars and clubs all over the Midwest. The band's debut album, R.E.O. Speedwagon, was released on Epic Records in 1971. The most popular track on this record was "157 Riverside Avenue"; it remains an in-concert favorite. The title refers to the address in Westport, Connecticut, where the band stayed while recording in Leka's studio in Bridgeport.

Although the rest of the band's lineup remained stable, REO Speedwagon switched lead vocalists three times for their first three albums. Luttrell left the band in early 1972, eventually becoming the vocalist for Starcastle. He was replaced by Kevin Cronin. Cronin recorded one album with the band, 1972's R.E.O./T.W.O. but left the band during the recording sessions for 1973's Ridin' the Storm Out because of internal conflicts. Ridin' the Storm Out was completed with Michael Bryan Murphy on lead vocal, and it featured Neal Doughty's "wailing storm siren" synthesizer intro on the title track. Murphy stayed on for two more albums, Lost in a Dream and This Time We Mean It, before Cronin returned to the fold in January 1976 and recorded R.E.O., which was released that same year.

Cronin's return came after Greg X. Volz turned down the position for lead vocalist after becoming a Christian.

In 1977, the REO members convinced Epic Records that their strength was in their live performances. Epic agreed to let them produce the band's first live album, Live: You Get What You Play For, which was eventually certified platinum. That same year, the band moved to Los Angeles.

In 1977, bassist Gregg Philbin left the band. Depending upon which member is expressing an opinion, it was either because Philbin was disenchanted with the new corporate-structure REO where Cronin and Richrath got bigger slices of the pie instead of the equal credit they once shared as a "garage band", or that he was asked to leave over his lifestyle issues affecting the music quality. Philbin was replaced by another Centennial High School (in Champaign, Illinois) alumnus, Bruce Hall, to record You Can Tune a Piano but You Can't Tuna Fish. The album was released in 1978 and has received FM radio airplay over the years, thanks to songs like "Roll with the Changes" and "Time for Me to Fly". The album was REO's first to make the top 40, peaking at No. 29. The album sold over two million copies in the US, ultimately achieving double platinum status.

In 1979, the band took a turn back to hard rock with the release of Nine Lives.

Mainstream success
On November 21, 1980, Epic released Hi Infidelity, which represented a change in sound, going from hard rock to more pop-oriented material. Hi Infidelity spawned four hit singles written by Richrath and Cronin, including the chart-topping "Keep On Loving You" (Cronin), plus "Take It on the Run" (#5) (Richrath), "In Your Letter" (#20) (Richrath), and "Don't Let Him Go" (#24) (Cronin), and remained on the charts for 65 weeks, 32 of which were spent in the top ten, including 15 weeks atop the Billboard 200. Hi Infidelity sold over 10 million copies.

The band's follow-up album, Good Trouble, was released in June 1982. Although it was not as successful as its predecessor, the album performed moderately well commercially, featuring the hit singles "Keep the Fire Burnin'" (U.S. #7), "Sweet Time" (U.S. #26) and the Album Rock chart hit "The Key".

Two years later, the band released Wheels Are Turnin', an album that included the No. 1 hit single "Can't Fight This Feeling" plus three more hits: "I Do' Wanna Know" (U.S. #29), "One Lonely Night" (U.S. #19), and "Live Every Moment" (U.S. #34).

REO Speedwagon toured the US in 1985, including a sold-out concert in Madison, Wisconsin in May. On July 13, on the way to a show in Milwaukee, the band made a stop in Philadelphia to play at the US leg of Live Aid, which broke a record for number of viewers. They performed "Can't Fight This Feeling" and "Roll with the Changes" which featured members of the Beach Boys, the band members' families, and Paul Shaffer on stage for backing vocals.

1987's Life as We Know It saw a decline in sales, but still managed to provide the band with the top-20 hits "That Ain't Love" (U.S. #16) and "In My Dreams" (U.S. #19). The Hits is a 1988 compilation album which contained the new tracks "I Don't Want to Lose You" and "Here with Me". These were the last songs recorded with Gary Richrath and Alan Gratzer. "Here with Me" cracked the top 20 of the Billboard Hot 100 and the top ten on the Adult Contemporary chart.

Changes in the 1990s
By the late 1980s, the band's popularity was starting to decline. Original drummer Alan Gratzer left in September 1988 after he decided to retire from music to open a restaurant. In early 1989, Gary Richrath was fired after tensions between him and Kevin Cronin boiled over. Cronin had been playing in The Strolling Dudes, a jazz ensemble that included jazz trumpet player Rick Braun (who had co-written the abovementioned "Here with Me" with Cronin), Miles Joseph on lead guitar and Graham Lear on drums. Lear had already been invited to join REO in September 1988 as Gratzer's successor and Joseph was brought in as a temporary stand-in for Richrath. Back up singers Carla Day and Melanie Jackson were also added. This lineup did only one show, on January 7, 1989, in Viña del Mar, Chile, where it won the award for best group at the city's annual International Song Festival. After that, Miles Joseph and the back up singers were dropped in favor of former Ted Nugent guitarist Dave Amato (who was brought aboard in May 1989) and keyboardist/songwriter/producer Jesse Harms.

The 1990 release The Earth, a Small Man, His Dog and a Chicken, with Bryan Hitt (formerly of Wang Chung) on drums, was a commercial disappointment. The album produced only one, and - to date - the band's last Billboard Hot 100 single, "Love Is a Rock", which peaked at No. 65. Harms, disenchanted by the album's failure, left the group in early 1991.

Shortly after his departure, Richrath assembled former members of the Midwestern band Vancouver to form a namesake band, Richrath. After touring for several years, the Richrath band released Only the Strong Survive in 1992 on the GNP Crescendo label. Richrath (the band) continued to perform for several years before disbanding in the late 1990s. In September 1998, Gary Richrath briefly joined REO onstage at the County Fair in Los Angeles to play on the band's encore song, "157 Riverside Avenue". He then joined REO once again in Los Angeles in May 2000 for the same encore but no serious plans for a reunion ever materialized.

Having lost their recording contract with Epic, REO Speedwagon ended up releasing Building the Bridge (1996) on the Priority/Rhythm Safari label. When that label went bankrupt, the album was released on Castle Records, which also experienced financial troubles. REO Speedwagon ultimately self-financed this effort, which failed to chart. The title track did make R&R's AC Top 30 chart.

Revival of the hits
The commercial failure of the band's newer material with its revised lineup demanded a change in marketing strategy. As a consequence, Epic began re-releasing recordings from older albums with updated artwork and design.

Since 1995, the label has released over a dozen compilation albums featuring greatest hits, including 1999's The Ballads which features two new songs: "Just for You" (Cronin and Jim Peterik) and "Till The River's Run Dry" (Cronin). In 2000, REO teamed up with Styx for an appearance at Riverport Amphitheater in St. Louis, which was released as a live concert video Arch Allies: Live at Riverport. The REO portion of the show was released again under three separate titles: Live - Plus (2001), Live Plus 3 (2001) and Extended Versions (2001) (which was certified gold by the RIAA on April 26, 2006). REO once again teamed with Styx in 2003 for the Classic Rock's Main Event tour which also included another band from their common rock era, Journey.

2000–present
The band released a self-financed album entitled Find Your Own Way Home in April 2007. Though it did not chart as an album, it produced two singles "I Needed to Fall" (Cronin) and "Find Your Own Way Home" (Cronin) which appeared on Billboard's Adult Contemporary radio chart.

REO Speedwagon continues to tour regularly, performing mostly their classic hits. They teamed up with Styx to record a new single entitled "Can't Stop Rockin'", released in March 2009, as well as for a full tour that included special guest .38 Special.

In November 2009, REO Speedwagon released a Christmas album, Not So Silent Night...Christmas with REO Speedwagon. On December 2, the band released an online video game, Find Your Own Way Home, produced by digital design agency Curious Sense. The game was the first "downloadable casual game" produced with a rock band and was cited by numerous publications including The New York Times as an innovative marketing product for a music act. In mid-2010, the band — then touring with Pat Benatar — announced that it would release a 30th anniversary deluxe edition reissue of Hi Infidelity.

REO Speedwagon headlined on the M&I Classic Rock Stage at the Milwaukee Summerfest on June 30, 2011. On March 11, 2012, Kevin Cronin appeared on the Canadian reality TV series Star Académie. He sang a sampling of REO's hits with the show's singing finalists.

On November 22, 2013, they announced a benefit concert with Styx titled "Rock to the Rescue" to raise money for the affected families of the tornadoes in central Illinois.  The concert was held on December 4, 2013, in Bloomington, Illinois. Richard Marx joined REO on stage for a joint performance of two of his hit songs.  Gary Richrath reunited with REO one final time for a performance of "Ridin' the Storm Out" to end REO's set at the sold-out concert.  Richrath stayed on stage to help with the encore of "With a Little Help From My Friends" along with REO, Styx, Richard Marx, and others.  Richrath was originally from the town of East Peoria which was damaged during the storm.  Families impacted by the storm and first responders sat near the stage for this special REO concert.

In early 2014, it was announced that REO Speedwagon and Chicago would be teaming up for 15 dates throughout 2014. Gary Richrath died on September 13, 2015, due to complications from surgery. In 2016 the band went on tour with Def Leppard and Tesla.

The band performed with Pitbull the song "Messin' Around" live on the ABC TV show Greatest Hits in 2016; that version of the song was also released as a single on iTunes. The band toured the UK arena circuit with Status Quo in December 2016. The band toured the US with Styx and Don Felder on the "United We Rock" tour, debuting June 20, 2017, at the Sunlight Supply Amphitheater. In 2017, the Hi Infidelity album received the Diamond Award for official U.S. sales of over 10 million copies. REO and Chicago teamed up once again in the summer of 2018 for a 30-city tour.

The band appeared in an episode in the third season of the American TV series Ozark, which was released on Netflix on March 27, 2020. After the appearance, four of REO's songs reentered the Billboard rock charts.

In 2021, REO Speedwagon was inducted into the Hall of Fame at the Illinois Rock & Roll Museum on Rt. 66 located in Joliet, Illinois. The group spent summer 2022 touring with Styx, on the Live and Unzoomed Tour, with Loverboy serving as the opening act.

Gregg Philbin died on October 24, 2022.

On January 4, 2023, the band announced their sole original member Neal Doughty would be retiring from the band after 55 years. Bassist Bruce Hall stated that he would always be part of the REO brotherhood, and left open the opportunity for Doughty to appear at select dates. The band announced Derek Hilland as a touring replacement for Doughty.

Band members

Current members
 Neal Doughty – keyboards, organ, piano, synthesizer (1966–present; non-touring 2023–present)
 Kevin Cronin – lead vocals, rhythm guitar, piano, keyboards (1972–1973, 1976–present)
 Bruce Hall  – bass guitar, vocals (songwriter 1974; 1977–present)
 Dave Amato – lead guitar, vocals (1989–present)
 Bryan Hitt – drums, percussion (1989–present)

Former members

 Alan Gratzer – drums, percussion, backing vocals (1966–1988; touring guest 2005–2017)
 Band leader – keyboards (1966–1967)
 Joe Matt – lead guitar, lead vocals (1966–1968)
 Mike Blair – bass guitar, lead vocals (1966–1968)
 Bill Fiorio (Duke Tumatoe) – lead guitar (1967–1969)
 Terry Luttrell – lead vocals (1968–1972)
 Bob Crownover – lead guitar (1968–1969)
 Gregg Philbin – bass guitar, backing vocals (1968–1977)
 Joe McCabe – saxophone (1968)
 Marty Shepard – trumpet (1968)
 Steve Scorfina – lead guitar (1969–1970)
 Gary Richrath – lead guitar, occasional vocals (1970–1989; touring guest 1999, 2003, 2005, 2011, 2013)
 Mike Murphy – lead vocals, occasional rhythm guitar (1973–1976)
 Greg X. Volz – lead vocals (1976)
 Graham Lear – drums, percussion (1988–1989)
 Carla Day – backing vocals (1988–1989)
 Melanie Jackson-Cracchiolo – backing vocals (1988–1989)
 Miles Joseph – lead guitar (1989)
 Rick Braun – trumpet (1989)
 Jesse Harms – keyboards, backing vocals (1989–1991)

Touring substitutes
 Joe Vannelli – keyboards (2007)
 Derek Hilland – keyboards, organ, piano, synthesizer, backing vocals (2023–present)

Touring guests
 Brian May – guitar (May 29, 1985, on "Johnny B. Goode")
 John Entwistle – bass guitar (May 29, 1985, on "Johnny B. Goode")
 John Aldridge – percussion, occasional drums (2005–2017)
 Jon Huntsman, Jr. – piano (September 15, 2005, Utah State Fair)
 Richard Marx – vocals (December 4, 2013, Rock to the Rescue benefit concert in Bloomington, IL)
 Larry the Cable Guy – guitar (December 4, 2013, Rock to the Rescue benefit concert in Bloomington, IL)

Discography

Studio albums
 R.E.O. Speedwagon (1971)
 R.E.O./T.W.O. (1972)
 Ridin' the Storm Out (1973)
 Lost in a Dream (1974)
 This Time We Mean It (1975)
 R.E.O. (1976)
 You Can Tune a Piano, but You Can't Tuna Fish (1978)
 Nine Lives (1979)
 Hi Infidelity (1980)
 Good Trouble (1982)
 Wheels Are Turnin' (1984)
 Life as We Know It (1987)
 The Earth, a Small Man, His Dog and a Chicken (1990)
 Building the Bridge (1996)
 Find Your Own Way Home (2007)
 Not So Silent Night ... Christmas with REO Speedwagon (2009)

See also
List of artists who reached number one in the United States

References

Notes

Citations

External links

 
 
 
 
 How REO Speedwagon Got Their Name
 REO Speedwagon Live Photo Gallery

1967 establishments in Illinois
Epic Records artists
American soft rock music groups
Hard rock musical groups from Illinois
Musical groups established in 1967
Musical groups from Champaign, Illinois
Musical quintets